Henry Thomas Ford (1893–1963) was an English professional football outside right who made over 240 appearances in the Football League for Chelsea.

Career

An outside right, Ford began his career with non-league clubs Fulham Amateurs and Tunbridge Wells Rangers. He transferred to First Division club Chelsea in April 1912 for a fee of £50, plus a further £50 if he played 10 first team matches. He was a part of the Chelsea team which reached the 1915 FA Cup Final and played his final match for the club in November 1923, by which time he had made 247 appearances and scored 46 goals.

Personal life 
In February 1916, 18 months after the outbreak of the First World War, Ford joined the Royal Flying Corps and trained as a rigger. He held the rank of air mechanic and was discharged in March 1919.

Career statistics

References

External links 

 

1893 births
1963 deaths
Footballers from Fulham
English footballers
Association football outside forwards
Association football inside forwards
Tunbridge Wells F.C. players
Chelsea F.C. players
English Football League players
Royal Air Force personnel of World War I
British Army personnel of World War I
Southern Football League players
Royal Flying Corps soldiers
FA Cup Final players